The 1960 NAIA Soccer Championship was the second annual tournament held by the NAIA to determine the national champion of men's college soccer among its members in the United States.

Elizabethtown and Newark Engineering (now NJIT) played to a 2–2 tie (called due to darkness after four overtime periods) and shared the NAIA national title; it was the first championship for either the Blue Jays or the Highlanders. The final was played at Slippery Rock State College in Slippery Rock, Pennsylvania.

Bracket

See also  
 1960 NCAA Soccer Championship

References 

NAIA championships
NAIA
NAIA
1960 in sports in Pennsylvania